Jason Scobie (born September 1, 1979 in Toledo, Ohio) is an American former professional baseball. He pitched for the Kia Tigers and Woori Heroes of the KBO League.

Minor league career
Scobie made his breakthrough with New York Mets affiliated minor league team Brooklyn Cyclones, with an ERA of 0.89 over 18 games. Over six years in the minors, Scobie maintained a 3.24 ERA and amassed 440 strikeouts. While on the Tides, he led the International League in victories and tied the Tides franchise record with 15 wins. Scobie, then 27, appeared in seven games for Syracuse, including three starts, and had a 1-2 record with a 3.18 ERA in 17 innings pitched. Kia officials said they liked Scobie's control on breaking pitches.

References

External links

Career statistics and player information from Korea Baseball Organization

1979 births
Living people
Sportspeople from Toledo, Ohio
KBO League pitchers
American expatriate baseball players in South Korea
Kia Tigers players
Brooklyn Cyclones players
St. Lucie Mets players
Norfolk Tides players
Syracuse SkyChiefs players
Syracuse Chiefs players
Binghamton Mets players
Kiwoom Heroes players
McLennan Highlanders baseball players
LSU Tigers baseball players
Capital City Bombers players
New Hampshire Fisher Cats players
Lancaster Barnstormers players